David M. Lewis is an American politician who served in the Montana Legislature from 2001 to 2015. A member of the Republican Party, he was its nominee for Lieutenant Governor of Montana alongside gubernatorial nominee Bob Brown in 2004.

Biography
Lewis was appointed to the Montana Senate District 42 seat, representing the Helena area, in 2004. He was elected in 2006 and 2010. He previously served two sessions in the Montana House of Representatives. Lewis held several positions for the State of Montana prior to being elected to the Montana House of Representatives, most recently including state budget director.

References

Living people
1942 births
Republican Party Montana state senators
Politicians from Helena, Montana
Politicians from Rapid City, South Dakota
Republican Party members of the Montana House of Representatives